Allan Kämpe was a Swedish science fiction comic, created by writer, journalist and artist Eugen Semitjov (1923–1987) in December 1942.

Setting
It all begins when Allan and his wife Eva Kämpe are flying around near the North Pole. They experience a possible fuel leak and crash in the cold winter landscape. Allan and Eva are then rescued by four people who claim to be the heads of something called Hjärntrusten ("Braintrust"). They are shown around, and get to see some technology that clearly is very advanced. Allan and Eva decide to join the Braintrust, and so the adventures begin.

Characters

Allan and Eva Kämpe
Allan and Eva Kämpe are both pilots, and while working for the Braintrust they get many opportunities to develop their skills, as they often fly aeroplanes and spaceships of various kinds. While Allan is the title character, Eva is not far behind, if at all. She is a self-willed and intelligent woman interested in new technological inventions, and while this is anything but spectacular today, it might have been more unusual for the hero and the heroine to be so equal back then. This comic was well before its time not only when it came to technology.

Technology
The Braintrust is formed by people who believe they can solve many of the world's problems by using science and advanced technology. Indeed, both the Braintrust as well as "the bad guys" make use of futuristic and advanced technology. A few examples of this includes: a form of nuclear powered ion thruster, a wide range of spaceships, ringformed space stations, "televisors", and technology for altering the weather. These things were, and most still are, decades before their time, considering this comic was drawn in the 1940s and the 1950s.

References
www.allankampe.net  

Allan Kämpe
Swedish comics characters
Science fiction characters
Allan Kämpe
Comics characters introduced in 1942
Male characters in comics
Fictional aviators
Arctic in fiction